https://www.facebook.com/SudhirParweBJP/

Sudhir Laxmanrao Parwe is a member of the 13th Maharashtra Legislative Assembly. He represents the Umred Assembly Constituency.And was the Chairman of Panchayati Raj Committee (State Minister Status),Maharashtra Legislature 2017-2019 He belongs to the Bharatiya Janata Party Parwe retained the seat he had won in 2009, he belonged to the Bharatiya Janata Party then too.

श्री सुधीर पारवे यांनी १९९७ ते २०१९ पर्यंत धारण केलेली पदे :-

1997 मध्ये करगाव जिल्हा परिषद सर्कल मधून निवडणूक लढवली.

1998 APMC भिवापूर, जिल्हा-नागपूर, महाराष्ट्र चे संचालक म्हणून निवड.

1999-2004 APMC भिवापूर, जि.चे उपाध्यक्ष म्हणून नियुक्ती नागपूर, महाराष्ट्र.

2002-2007: कारगाव विभाग, जिल्हा नागपूर, महाराष्ट्र येथून जिल्हा परिषद सदस्य म्हणून निवडून आले.

2007-2009 भिवापूर विभाग, जिल्हा नागपूर, महाराष्ट्र येथून जिल्हा परिषद सदस्य म्हणून निवडून आले.

2009-2014: महाराष्ट्राच्या उमरेड 051 (SC) मतदारसंघातून विधानसभेचे सदस्य (आमदार) म्हणून निवडून आले.

2010: महाराष्ट्र विधिमंडळ च्या रोजगार हमी योजना समितीवर सदस्य म्हणून नियुक्ती.

2014-2019: महाराष्ट्राच्या उमरेड 051 (SC) मतदारसंघातून विधानसभेचे सदस्य (आमदार) म्हणून पुन्हा निवडून आले.

2015: महाराष्ट्र विधानमंडळाच्या अनुसूचित जाती कल्याण समितीवर सदस्य म्हणून नियुक्ती.

2017: महाराष्ट्र विधानमंडळाच्या पंचायती राज समितीचे (राज्यमंत्री दर्जा) अध्यक्ष म्हणून नियुक्ती.

महाराष्ट्रातील उमरेड 051 (SC) मतदारसंघातून 2019 ची विधानसभा निवडणूक लढवली.

राजकीय जबाबदारी :- 

1998-2008: भाजप भिवापूर मंडळ, जिल्हा नागपूर, महाराष्ट्राचे सरचिटणीस म्हणून नियुक्ती. 

2008: भाजप भिवापूर मंडळ, जिल्हा-नागपूर, महाराष्ट्राच्या अध्यक्षपदी नियुक्ती.

2008 छत्तीसगडच्या भाजप प्रभारी बस्तर (ST) मतदारसंघाच्या विधानसभा निवडणुका.

Controversy
In April, 2015, Parwe was sentenced to a two-year jail term for slapping a primary school teacher in 2005. He has appealed against this sentence, and has been granted bail. Parwe was a member of the Kargao Zilla Parishad Constituency then, the aggrieved teacher, who was also the acting head master had allegedly misbehaved with a female school employee.

References

Living people
Year of birth missing (living people)
Bharatiya Janata Party politicians from Maharashtra
Maharashtra district councillors
Maharashtra MLAs 2009–2014
Maharashtra MLAs 2014–2019
Marathi politicians
People from Nagpur district